Sparnopolius is a genus of bee flies, insects in the family Bombyliidae. There are about 17 described species in Sparnopolius.

Species
These 17 species belong to the genus Sparnopolius:

 Sparnopolius anomalus (Painter, 1940) i c g
 Sparnopolius cockerelli (Hesse, 1938) c g
 Sparnopolius coloradensis Grote, 1867 i c g
 Sparnopolius confusus (Wiedemann, 1824) i c g b
 Sparnopolius distinctus (Walker, 1852) c g
 Sparnopolius diversus Williston, 1901 i c g
 Sparnopolius heteropterus (Macquart, 1840) c
 Sparnopolius hyalinus (Fabricius, 1805) c g
 Sparnopolius hyalipennis (Macquart, 1846) c
 Sparnopolius inornatus (Walker, 1849) c g
 Sparnopolius karasanus (Hesse, 1938) c
 Sparnopolius leucopygus (Wulp, 1885) c g
 Sparnopolius megacephalus (Portschinsky, 1887) c g
 Sparnopolius nigracinctus (Roberts, 1929) c g
 Sparnopolius ochrobasis Hall and Evenhuis, 1982 i c g
 Sparnopolius permixtus (Hesse, 1938) c g
 Sparnopolius teniurostris (Roberts, 1928) c g

Data sources: i = ITIS, c = Catalogue of Life, g = GBIF, b = Bugguide.net

References

Further reading

External links

 

Bombyliidae genera
Articles created by Qbugbot